Sabine Appelmans and Laurence Courtois were the defending champions but only Appelmans competed that year with Miriam Oremans.

Appelmans and Oremans lost in the first round to Julie Halard and Nathalie Tauziat.

Meredith McGrath and Larisa Neiland won in the final 6–4, 6–1 against Manon Bollegraf and Rennae Stubbs.

Seeds
Champion seeds are indicated in bold text while text in italics indicates the round in which those seeds were eliminated.

 Meredith McGrath /  Larisa Neiland (champions)
 Manon Bollegraf /  Rennae Stubbs (final)
 Julie Halard /  Nathalie Tauziat (semifinals)
 Jana Novotná /  Mary Pierce (semifinals)

Draw

External links
 1995 Open Gaz de France Doubles Draw

Open GDF Suez
1995 WTA Tour